Seen / Unseen is a 2022 compilation by American experimental pop act Sweet Trip, released on March 18, 2022, by Darla Records.

Background 
In 2021, Sweet Trip released their first studio album in 12 years, A Tiny House, In Secret Speeches, Polar Equals, after officially reforming in 2019 to release new music due to fan demand. However, just a year later, on January 29, 2022, Valerie Cooper announced she was leaving Sweet Trip due to personal reasons, reducing the act to just Roby Burgos. Despite this, Darla Records continued to put out re-releases of their old material, with a re-release of their 1999 EP Alura announced that February.

On March 17, Darla Records put out an announcement on their Instagram that they were releasing the 50-track compilation Seen / Unseen at midnight, with a vinyl pre-order available as well. The compilation was being put together prior to the band's breakup, with Roby providing a collection of 57 tracks, and Valerie and Darla independently culling the tracks down. It is based on a popular YouTube bootleg consisting mostly of tracks released on SoundCloud by Roby, with the official release containing all those songs alongside a large selection of demos and shelved tracks by the band.

Track listing

Digital Version 
Track list adapted from digital release.

Disc 1

Disc 2

Disc 3

LP Version 
Track list adapted from Darla Records.

Side A

Side B

Side C

Side D

References

2022 compilation albums
Sweet Trip albums
Darla Records albums